Phyla dulcis (syn. Lippia dulcis) is a species of perennial herbaceous plant that is native to southern Mexico, the Caribbean (Cuba, Hispaniola, and Puerto Rico), Central America, Colombia, and Venezuela. It is known by several common names, including Aztec sweet herb, bushy lippia, honeyherb, hierba dulce, and tzopelic-xihuitl (Nahuatl). Its buds are also sold as dushi or dulce (sweet in Papiamento and Spanish respectively) buttons.

Uses
This plant has historically been used as a natural sweetener and medicinal herb in its native Mexico and parts of Central America. It was used by the Aztecs and introduced to the Spanish when they arrived.

The sweet taste is caused by a sesquiterpene compound called hernandulcin, which was discovered in 1985 and named for Francisco Hernández, the Spanish physician who first described the plant in the sixteenth century. Use of Phyla dulcis has not become widespread because it also contains high levels bitter compounds, especially camphor.

References

External links

dulcis
Sugar substitutes
Flora of Central America
Flora of Cuba
Flora of Colombia
Flora of the Dominican Republic
Flora of Haiti
Flora of Puerto Rico
Flora of Mexico
Flora of Venezuela
Native American cuisine
Plants described in 1934
Plants used in traditional Native American medicine
Flora without expected TNC conservation status